Millennium Tower is a 35-story,  skyscraper in Rotterdam, Netherlands design by WZMH Architects and AGS Architecten.  It was completed in 2000. The tower was built on Weena in front of the Central station. It is mixed use, the first 15 floors belong to the Rotterdam Marriott Hotel, including 2 restaurant, the other floor are being used as offices.

Construction
The tower was originally designed to be built with hollow-core slabs, but close to building start the design was changed to incorporate the BubbleDeck system. This was the first time this new method was in use in the Netherlands, and also the first major project worldwide to incorporate this technique.

In spite of the late design change, the project was finished before time, due to a reduction in the erection cycles from 10 to 4 days per level, and a reduction in crane lift by app 50 percent.

When finished, Millennium Tower was the second tallest building in the Netherlands.

Construction features
Faster building time
Less flooring height due beamless structure resulting in two extra levels within original building height
The green credentials: Reduced the number of truckloads into central Rotterdam by 500

References

External links
The Rotterdam Marriott Hotel Rotterdam official website
The Rotterdam Marriott Hotel local Dutch website
The Millennium Tower

Hotel buildings completed in 2000
Office buildings completed in 2000
Buildings and structures celebrating the third millennium
Skyscrapers in Rotterdam
Skyscraper hotels in the Netherlands
Skyscraper office buildings in the Netherlands
Residential skyscrapers in the Netherlands
WZMH Architects buildings